The Savage Dragon is a half-hour animated television series aired as part of the Cartoon Express on the USA Network. Co-produced by Universal Cartoon Studios, P3 Entertainment, Lacewood Productions for season 1 and Studio B Productions for season 2, it ran for 26 episodes from 1995 to 1996 and featured numerous supporting characters from the comic book series, including She-Dragon, Horde, Barbaric, Mako and Overlord.

The Dragon was voiced by Jim Cummings. Additional voices were provided by Mark Hamill, Michael Dorn, Jennifer Hale, René Auberjonois, Frank Welker, Paul Eiding, Rob Paulsen and Tony Jay.

Episode 21 of Savage Dragon, "Endgame", served as the second part of a four-part crossover with three other shows in USA's "Action Extreme Team" programming block: Street Fighter, Mortal Kombat: Defenders of the Realm, and Wing Commander Academy.

The series is currently available to stream on Peacock.

Cast

Main cast
 René Auberjonois as Horde
 Jeff Glen Bennett as Barbaric / Mako The Shark / Sergeant Howard Niseman
 Jim Cummings as Savage Dragon / Doubleheader
 Jennifer Hale as She-Dragon
 Dorian Harewood as Lieutenant Frank Darling / R. Richard Richards
 Tony Jay as Overlord
 Danny Mann as Fiend / Open Face
 Rob Paulsen as John Backwood / Octopus
 Kath Soucie as Alex Wilde
 Frank Welker as Arachnid / Basher

Additional voices
Gregg Berger
Ruth Buzzi
Darleen Carr
Dave Coulier as Gilroy
Michael Dorn as The Warrior King
Paul Eiding
Jeannie Elias
Richard Gilbert Hill
Allan Lurie
Mark Hamill
Robert Picardo
Peter Renaday
Neil Ross
Cree Summer
Marcelo Tubert
Paul Williams

Episodes

Season one (1995)

Season two (1996)

Crossover
Episode 21 ("Endgame") is part 2 of a 4-episode crossover with several other shows that aired as part of the US "Action Extreme Team" programming block:
 Mortal Kombat: Defenders of the Realm (1996, US, animated): episode 9 "Resurrection" (Part 3)
 Street Fighter (1995–1997, US/CA, animated): episode 22 (209) "The Warrior King" (Part 1)
 Wing Commander Academy (1996, US, animated): episode 8 "Recreation" (Part 4)

This crossover event featured the Warrior King and the orb but the principal characters of the four series don't meet each other.

Toyline
To coincide with the animated series, Playmates Toys produced a toyline of five action figures featuring the Dragon, She-Dragon, and Barbaric.

References

External links

1995 American television series debuts
1996 American television series endings
1990s American animated television series
1995 Canadian television series debuts
1996 Canadian television series endings
1990s Canadian animated television series
American children's animated action television series
American children's animated adventure television series
American children's animated science fantasy television series
American children's animated superhero television series
Animated television series about dragons
Canadian children's animated action television series
Canadian children's animated adventure television series
Canadian children's animated science fantasy television series
Canadian children's animated superhero television series
USA Network original programming
USA Action Extreme Team
English-language television shows
Television series by Universal Animation Studios
Television shows based on comics
Television series based on Image Comics